Noah Rubin (born February 21, 1996) is an American former professional tennis player. He is a former Wimbledon junior singles champion, and a former USTA junior national champion in both singles and doubles. After turning pro in 2015, he won four ATP Challenger titles.

Rubin also played college tennis for the Wake Forest Demon Deacons in the 2014–15 season. Entering the year as the ITA No. 1 ranked college freshman, he finished the season as an All-American and the runner-up in the 2015 NCAA singles championship.

Despite only peaking at No. 125 in the world, Rubin became a notable player on the tour for his efforts to advocate for mental health awareness on the ATP Tour and greater pay for lower-ranked professional players.

In October 2022, Rubin announced he would pursue a career as a professional pickleball player.

Early life and education
Rubin is Jewish, and his bar mitzvah had a tennis theme. He attended the Merrick Jewish Center religious school, and collected donated tennis rackets for the Israel Tennis Centers as his mitzvah project. He has said, "I want people to know I'm Jewish and I like to represent the Jewish people."

His father Eric Rubin works as a banker, and his mother Melanie is an educator. His father was the top player on the tennis team at Martin Van Buren High School in Queens. As a junior, Noah was coached by his father and Lawrence Kleger. His older sister Jessie was captain of the Binghamton University tennis team.

He has lived in Rockville Centre and Merrick, New York.  He attended Levy-Lakeside Elementary School and Merrick Avenue Middle School, and then went to John F. Kennedy High School in Bellmore, Long Island for one year, after which he studied via an online program at the Laurel Springs School, graduating in 2014.

Junior career

Rubin played for the John McEnroe Tennis Academy on Randalls Island in Manhattan. By the age of seven, Rubin was competing in 12-and-under events, and he was winning international competitions by the time he was eleven.  In 2010, he made it to the finals at Les Petits As in Tarbes, France. In 2011, when Rubin was 15, John McEnroe called him "the most talented player we've come across." He also won the Copa Del Café, a Junior ITF tournament in Costa Rica, in 2012.

As a junior, Rubin reached as high as no. 6 in the International Tennis Federation's world junior ranking and no. 1 in the United States in 2014.

He qualified for the boys' singles tournament at Wimbledon in July 2014, and won the tournament in the first all-American final there since 1977. He was the first American boy to win Wimbledon since Donald Young in 2007. He had played only one other event in 2014 before Wimbledon at the French Open, where he lost in the second round.

The month after hoisting the trophy at Wimbledon, Rubin played in and won the 2014 U.S. Tennis Association's Boys 18s National Championships in both singles and doubles (with close friend Stefan Kozlov). The latter success came with two big bonuses of main-draw wild cards into the singles and doubles events at the US Open.

College career
Rubin attended and played tennis for Wake Forest University in North Carolina, where part of his schedule was to play pro events. His scholarship there allowed him to leave the university after one year and return at any time to complete his degree.  In September 2014, Rubin was ranked the No. 1 Division 1 college freshman by the Intercollegiate Tennis Association (ITA).

Rubin ended his 2014–15 freshman season with a 26–4 record, mostly playing no. 1 singles, and ranked no. 5 in the U.S. He was the first player in Atlantic Coast Conference history to be named both men's tennis ACC Player and Freshman of the Year in his freshman season, and was the first Wake Forest ACC men's tennis Player of the Year, and the third to win Freshman of the Year.  He was an All-American, ITA Rookie of the Year, four-time ACC Player of the Week, and ITA Carolina Region Rookie of the Year. Playing doubles mostly with Jon Ho at No. 2 doubles, he had a 15–6 record. He lost in the finals of the 2015 NCAA singles championship to Ryan Shane.

Professional career

2015–2016
Rubin turned pro in June 2015 at the age of 19. He made his first final on the ATP Challenger Tour at Charlottesville, and won by defeating fellow American teenager Tommy Paul, despite being down 5–1 in the second set with Paul serving for the match. As the only American to win an event in the Australian Open Wild Card Challenge, Rubin was awarded a wild card into the main draw at the Australian Open. With his wild card, Rubin entered his second career Grand Slam event as the lowest-ranked non-PR player (328th overall) in the main draw of the 2016 Australian Open, where he beat the 17th-seeded Benoit Paire in three tiebreaks in the first round.

Rubin cracked the Top 200 for the first time by qualifying for the 2016 Indian Wells Masters tournament. In the clay court season, he recorded an upset win over 59th-ranked Denis Kudla, the No. 1 seed at the Sarasota Open. Having missed most of the summer tournaments due to a rolled ankle injury he suffered while jogging in June that cost him five months of training and competition, Rubin returned to form in October, reaching his second career Challenger final at Stockton.

2017–2018
Rubin started the 2017 season by winning his first round match at the Australian Open, before falling to eventual champion Roger Federer in the second round. He then went back to Australia and won his second Challenger title at Launceston, Tasmania, in an all-American final against Mitchell Krueger. For the second consecutive year, Rubin missed a few consecutive months of the late spring and early summer due to injury; this one a severely sprained right wrist that he suffered in April when he slipped on a clay court during a tournament in Houston that resulted in him losing 10 months of serious competition and training. He bounced back near the end of the season to finish the year on the cusp of the Top 200, just as in 2016.

Once again, Rubin began the 2018 season by playing at the BNP Paribas de Nouvelle-Calédonie. At this tournament, he greatly improved on his second-round result from the previous year and reached his fourth Challenger final, all four of which have been against other Americans. In the final, Rubin defeated Taylor Fritz to claim his third Challenger title to boost himself to a new career-high ranking of No. 162 in the world. After falling out of the Top 200, Rubin won a fourth Challenger title at the Tallahassee Tennis Challenger. This was his first title on clay and put him back in the Top 200 of the ATP rankings. The title also helped him clinch the French Open Wild Card Challenge to earn a wild card into the main draw of the French Open. In his debut at the tournament, he was beaten by compatriot John Isner.

2019–2022
Rubin played in the main draw of the 2021 Winston-Salem Open as a lucky loser. He lost 6-2, 6-0 to former world #1 Andy Murray. Rubin defeated #1 seed Ernesto Escobedo in the first round of qualifying at the 2022 Hall of Fame Open, but lost in the final round of qualifying to William Blumberg. His last career professional match was in the 2022 Citi Open where he lost 6-2, 6-0 to Taro Daniel in the first round of qualifying.

On September 19, 2022, Rubin, in an Instagram post announced he would be taking an indefinite break from professional tennis. Rubin stated that he was unhappy with his current level of play and sustained a wrist injury that may have required surgery if he wanted to continue playing at a professional level. In the post, Rubin did not rule out returning to professional tennis, but he stated he will be involved with a number of endeavors including "documentaries, clothing lines [and] clubs." In October 2022, Rubin announced he would become a professional pickleball player.

Personal life
Rubin's hobbies are photography, soccer, and art. Rubin has an Instagram account that has met with “modest success,” Behind the Racquet, where players share personal struggles of living on the professional tour. Rubin has found the process to be therapeutic for dealing with the realities of “often lonely, physically taxing life” of professional tennis. He said, 

The platform has been used by tennis players including Coco Gauff, Bianca Andreescu, and Katie Swan, to discuss their mental health, monetary concerns, and other issues.

Challenger and Futures finals

Singles: 12 (4–8)

Doubles: 3 (1–2)

Junior Grand Slam finals

Boys' singles

Singles performance timeline

Record against other players

Record against top 10 players
Rubin's match record against those who have been ranked in the top 10. Players who have been No. 1 are in boldface.

 Marcos Baghdatis 1–0
 Mikhail Youzhny 1–0
 John Isner 1–1
 Lucas Pouille 1–1
 Nicolás Almagro 0–1
 Roger Federer 0–1
 Fabio Fognini 0–1
 Karen Khachanov 0–1
 Daniil Medvedev 0–1
 Andy Murray 0–1
 Kei Nishikori 0–1
 Andrey Rublev 0–1

* .

Wins over top 10 players

See also
List of select Jewish tennis players

References

External links
 
 
 
 Wake Forest bio

American male tennis players
1996 births
Living people
Jewish American sportspeople
Jewish tennis players
Wake Forest Demon Deacons men's tennis players
People from Merrick, New York
People from Rockville Centre, New York
People from Bellmore, New York
Wimbledon junior champions
John F. Kennedy High School (Bellmore, New York) alumni
Grand Slam (tennis) champions in boys' singles
21st-century American Jews
Tennis people from New York (state)